Sage Kirkpatrick is a Czech actress best known for playing Dexter Morgan's mother, Laura Moser, in the Showtime TV drama series, Dexter. She is sometimes credited under the name Katherine Kirkpatrick.

Career
Kirkpatrick began her acting career appearing in erotic movies and television series such as Ultimate Love Games, Club Wild Side and Beverly Hills Bordello. She also made guest appearances on Days of Our Lives, The O.C., The Shield and CSI: Crime Scene Investigation.

Credited under the name Katherine Kirkpatrick, she appeared in seasons one, two and three of Dexter, in the episodes, "Seeing Red", "Born Free", "The Dark Defender", "Dex, Lies and Videotape", "Turning Biminese" and "Do You Take Dexter Morgan?".

After Dexter, Kirkpatrick made guest appearances on episodes of Scandal, House of Lies, How to Get Away with Murder and Grey's Anatomy. Kirkpatrick also works as a professional photographer.

Filmography

References

External links

Living people
1969 births
20th-century Czech actresses
21st-century Czech actresses
Czech film actresses
Czech television actresses
Czech photographers